An annular solar eclipse will occur on May 9, 2032. A solar eclipse occurs when the Moon passes between Earth and the Sun, thereby totally or partly obscuring the image of the Sun for a viewer on Earth. An annular solar eclipse occurs when the Moon's apparent diameter is smaller than the Sun's, blocking most of the Sun's light and causing the Sun to look like an annulus (ring). An annular eclipse appears as a partial eclipse over a region of the Earth thousands of kilometres wide.

Images 
Animated path

Related eclipses

Solar eclipses 2029–2032

Saros 148

Metonic cycle

See also
 List of solar eclipses in the 21st century

References

External links 
 NASA graphics

2032 5 9
2032 in science
2032 5 9
2032 5 9